Ester Goldfeld (born July 4, 1993) is a junior American tennis player. Her highest WTA singles ranking is 438, which she reached on June 7, 2010. Her career high in doubles is 794, achieved on June 21, 2010.

ITF Circuit finals

Singles finals (1)

Doubles finals 2 (1–1)

External links
 
 

1993 births
Living people
American female tennis players
Tennis people from New York (state)
Duke Blue Devils women's tennis players